Ectoedemia petrosa is a moth of the family Nepticulidae. It was described by Rimantas Puplesis in 1988. It is known from Tadzhikistan.

References

Nepticulidae
Moths of Asia
Moths described in 1988